Millersburg is a borough in Dauphin County, Pennsylvania, United States. The population was 2,541 at the 2020 census. It is part of the Harrisburg–Carlisle Metropolitan Statistical Area.

Geography
Millersburg is located in northwestern Dauphin County on the east bank of the Susquehanna River at  (40.541676, -76.957283). Wiconisco Creek enters the Susquehanna at the southern edge of the borough.

Pennsylvania Route 147 passes through the center of Millersburg as Market Street, leading north (upriver)  to Sunbury and south (downriver)  to U.S. Route 22 near Duncannon. The Millersburg Ferry leads west across the Susquehanna to Buffalo Township in Perry County, allowing a connection to U.S. Routes 11 and 15.

History
Millersburg was founded in 1807 by Daniel Miller, for whom the town was named.

The Millersburg Ferry and Millersburg Passenger Rail Station are listed on the National Register of Historic Places.

During the spring of 1790, Daniel Miller and his brother, John were traveling north along the Susquehanna River. When they arrived at the north side of Berry's Mountain, tradition has it, Daniel was so taken with the beauty of the area where the Wiconisco Creek joined with the Susquehanna that he resolved to purchase the land at that location. On June 2, 1790, Miller received a deed for 979-1/4 acres at the mouth of the Wiconisco Creek from William Von Phul of Philadelphia, the owner of the land upon which Millersburg is now situated.

In 1794, Miller built his first cabin that later served as a school in which he taught the children of the surrounding area without compensation. The building was on the site of the old Johnson-Baillie Shoe Company factory on Pine near Market Street. It was not until 1805, upon completion of a more suitable dwelling which still stands on the northeast corner of Pine and Walnut streets that Miller brought his wife, Elizabeth, and their two children to their new home. In 1807, Miller's dream of a town on the banks of the Susquehanna became a reality. During that year, he had the land surveyed and laid out into lots, reserving land for churches, the town square and a riverside park. Until a church could be built, Miller, who was a lay minister of the Methodist Church, held services in his own home.

Transportation in Millersburg has always been a very important commodity to the community. Two major transportation projects were planned for Millersburg in the 19th century: one was the Lykens Valley R.R. & Coal Company, and the other was the extension of the Pennsylvania Canal, both proposed in the 1830s. The state began construction of the Wiconisco Canal as part of the Eastern Division of the Pennsylvania Canal in 1837. Millersburg was the northern terminus of the Dauphin County Canal network.

Demographics

As of the census of 2000, there were 2,562 people, 1,213 households, and 695 families residing in the borough. The racial makeup of the borough was 98.52% White, 0.23% African American, 0.12% Native American, 0.51% Asian, 0.31% from other races, and 0.31% from two or more races. Hispanic or Latino of any race were 1.09% of the population.

There were 1,213 households, out of which 24.4% had children under the age of 18 living with them, 44.0% were married couples living together, 9.3% had a female householder with no husband present, and 42.7% were non-families. 37.8% of all households were made up of individuals, and 20.4% had someone living alone who was 65 years of age or older. The average household size was 2.11 and the average family size was 2.78.

In the borough the population was spread out, with 20.6% under the age of 18, 9.2% from 18 to 24, 28.4% from 25 to 44, 20.6% from 45 to 64, and 21.2% who were 65 years of age or older. The median age was 39 years. For every 100 females, there were 84.8 males. For every 100 females age 18 and over, there were 84.8 males.

The median income for a household in the borough was $34,970, and the median income for a family was $44,327. Males had a median income of $29,625 versus $23,205 for females. The per capita income for the borough was $19,217. About 4.7% of families and 6.8% of the population were below the poverty line, including 5.8% of those under age 18 and 7.8% of those age 65 or over.

Millersburg ferry 

The Millersburg Ferry, the last surviving ferry which crosses the Susquehanna River, and the last wooden-stern paddle-wheel ferry operating within the United States, operates out of Millersburg, which sits on the east side of the river. According to a sign posted at the ferry dock, a ferry has operated here since 1825. The original ferries were poled across the river. Paddle-wheel boats went into operation in 1873. The current ferries are wooden-stern paddle-wheelers which can carry up to four automobiles. The one-mile crossing goes to a point on the west side of the Susquehanna, in a campground near the point where Pennsylvania Route 34 meets U.S. Route 11 and U.S. Route 15, and near Liverpool. The ferry boats were officially listed on the National Register of Historic Places in 2006.

The ferry follows a course across the river near a submerged man-made wall composed of river rocks and debris which provides slightly deeper clearance and prevents the ferry from grounding out.

Ned Smith Center for Nature and Art
Millersburg is the home of the Ned Smith Center for Nature and Art, opened on October 9, 2004 which is named after local wildlife artist and frequent columnist of "Gone for the Day" featured in the Pennsylvania Game News. The Center features three gallery spaces, a gift shop, offices, classrooms, and over 500 acres of trails and streams for outdoor activities. During the Spring and Summer months, the Ned Smith Center hosts a variety of live performances on the DeSoto Amphitheater.  One weekend might feature the PA Regional Ballet and the next may be a classic rock band followed the next by the sounds of a "big band". It is a BYOB venue but also has food and "adult beverages" available for sale.  The Ned Smith Center is also well known for its environmental and arts education.  A variety of youth summer camps, family "discovery programs" and school field trips are available.

References

External links

 Borough of Millersburg official website
 Photographs of the Millersburg Ferry
 Ned Smith Center for Nature and Art

Pennsylvania populated places on the Susquehanna River
Harrisburg–Carlisle metropolitan statistical area
Boroughs in Dauphin County, Pennsylvania
1864 establishments in Pennsylvania
Populated places established in 1807